K21JQ-D, virtual channel 36 (UHF digital channel 21), is a low-power low-powered, Class A religious television station licensed to Walla Walla, Washington, United States.

In 2009, the former-K22BI terminated analog service when its owners, Blue Mountain Broadcasting Association, transitioned to digital television.

External links
Blue Mountain Television official site 
Esperanza TV official site
 

Religious television stations in the United States
Walla Walla, Washington
Television stations in Washington (state)
Low-power television stations in the United States
Television channels and stations established in 1991
1991 establishments in Washington (state)